Sympistis albifasciata is a species of moth in the family Noctuidae (the owlet moths). It is found in North America.

The MONA or Hodges number for Sympistis albifasciata is 10076.

References

Further reading

 
 
 

albifasciata
Articles created by Qbugbot
Moths described in 1906